The Kayagar languages are a small family of four closely related Trans–New Guinea languages spoken around the Cook River of Indonesian New Guinea:

Atohwaim (Kaugat)
Gondu River
Yogo ('Tamagario')
Kayagar (Kaygir), Tamagario (Arare–Pagai)

Proto-language

Pronouns
Usher (2020) reconstructs the pronouns as:
{| 
! !!colspan=2|Gondu River!!colspan=2|Atohwaim
|-
! !!sg!!pl!!sg!!pl
|-
!1
|*nax ||*nep ||naxa ||nipi, neβi
|-
!2
|*ax ||*akan ||axa ||aʔani 
|-
!3
|*ek ||*wep ||– ||– 
|}

Basic vocabulary
Some lexical reconstructions by Usher (2020) are:

{| class="wikitable sortable"
! gloss !! Proto-Gondu River
|-
| head || *toxom
|-
| hair || *upm
|-
| ear || *itipaːm
|-
| eye || *sakam
|-
| nose || *jup
|-
| tooth || *o[x/ɣ]om
|-
| tongue || *maetap
|-
| foot/leg || *apit
|-
| blood || *jes
|-
| bone || *nomop
|-
| skin/bark || *pip
|-
| breast || *etum
|-
| louse || *num
|-
| dog || *epe
|-
| pig || *wakum
|-
| bird || *suopam
|-
| egg || *map-jaxam
|-
| tree/wood || *wom
|-
| man/person || *jo[k]
|-
| woman || *enop
|-
| sun || *taːm
|-
| moon || *xa[x/ɣ]atam
|-
| water || *o[x/ɣ]om
|-
| fire || *atu
|-
| stone || *maitn
|-
| path || *kamein
|-
| name || *na[k]
|-
| eat || *xapti
|-
| one || *pa[x/ɣ]amo[x/k]
|-
| two || *tousiki
|}

Vocabulary comparison
The following basic vocabulary words are from McElhanon & Voorhoeve (1970) and Voorhoeve (1971, 1975), as cited in the Trans-New Guinea database:

{| class="wikitable sortable"
! gloss !! Atohwaim !! Kayagar !! Tamagario
|-
! head
| tikem || toxom || tokom
|-
! hair
| upm || owpm || upm
|-
! ear
| icoxop || iripam || ipiram
|-
! eye
| saam || saxam || sakam
|-
! nose
| opom || jup || jup
|-
! tooth
| ukoxom || oxom || ukom
|-
! tongue
| menaxaram || marap || marap
|-
! leg
| apir || apir || apir
|-
! louse
| numu || soːm || 
|-
! dog
| upoc || epere; epe(re) || epe
|-
! pig
| wakum || wakum || wakum
|-
! bird
| wakem || səpam || towpam
|-
! egg
| mapiam || mapiaxam || mapiakam
|-
! blood
| wis || jes; yes || jet; yet
|-
! bone
| nömöp || namop; nəmop || nomop
|-
! skin
| piep || pip || pip
|-
! breast
| ötöm ||  || erem
|-
! tree
| wim || wom || wom
|-
! man
| mapirie || jo; yo || jo; yo
|-
! woman
| enepe || onop || onop
|-
! sun
| teme || taam || taam
|-
! moon
| kaʔaram || xaxaram || kakaram
|-
! water
| oxom || oxom || okom
|-
! fire
| acu || aru || aru
|-
! stone
| iki || kakup || maitu
|-
! road, path
| sepmop || xami || kame
|-
! eat
| owp || xapri || kapri
|-
! one
| papriaxap || paxamu || pakamok
|-
! two
| coopm || tosigi || totigi
|}

References

External links 
 Timothy Usher, New Guinea World, Proto–Gondu River
 (ibid.) Atohwaim

 
Languages of western New Guinea
Cook River–Kolopom languages